Joseph Francis Perantoni (September 13, 1923 – September 11, 1991) was an American football player who played at the center position. He played college football for Princeton and professional football for the New York Yankees.

Early years
Perantoni was born in 1923 in Raritan, New Jersey. He attended and played football at Somerville High School and then played at Blair Academy after he graduated, both in New Jersey.

College football and military service
Perantoni attended Princeton University and played for the 1942 Princeton Tigers football team. He became the second freshman to gain a spot in Princeton's varsity lineup.

His college career was interrupted by World War II. He was a pilot who flew B-24s in the United States Army Air Corps.

Perantoni returned to Princeton after the ware and played for the 1946 and 1947 Princeton seasons. In October 1946, he was elected by his teammates as the team captain. At the end of the 1947 season, he received Princeton's top football award, the John Prentiss Poe Cup. Coach Charlie Caldwell called Perantoni "one of the finest football players I have seen in 22 years of coaching." He was also invited to play in the East-West Shrine Game in 1946.

Professional football
He played professional football in the All-America Football Conference (AAFC) for the New York Yankees during the 1948 and 1949 seasons. He appeared in a total of 26 games for the Yankees. He was the first person from Raritan to play professional football. On November 28, 1948, the Yankees celebrated "Perantoni Day" at Yankee Stadium; he was presented with an automobile by fans as part of the celebration.

Family and later years
Perantoni was married in December 1946 to Madeline Harcarik. After his playing career ended, he went to work as an architect. In 1950, he was a founder of the firm of Shive, Spinelli and Perantoni in New Jersey. He remained with that firm as an active partner until 1979 and as a consultant until his death. In 1991, Perantoni died at age 67 in Somerville, New Jersey, where he had lived for several decades.

References

1923 births
1991 deaths
Blair Academy alumni
New York Yankees (AAFC) players
Princeton Tigers football players
Players of American football from New Jersey
People from Raritan, New Jersey
Sportspeople from Somerville, New Jersey
Somerville High School (New Jersey) alumni
Sportspeople from Somerset County, New Jersey
American football centers
United States Army Air Forces bomber pilots of World War II
Military personnel from New Jersey